Brening Sangma is an Indian politician and member of the National People's Party. Sangma is currently a member of the Meghalaya Legislative Assembly for the third time. Sangma was a member of the Meghalaya Legislative Assembly from the Kherapara constituency in West Garo Hills district as Indian National Congress candidate in 1993 and 1998.

References 

People from West Garo Hills district
Nationalist Congress Party politicians from Meghalaya
Indian National Congress politicians
Samajwadi Party politicians
Living people
Meghalaya politicians
Meghalaya MLAs 2018–2023
National People's Party (India) politicians
Year of birth missing (living people)
Meghalaya MLAs 1993–1998
Meghalaya MLAs 1998–2003
Garo people